84th Street may refer to:

84 Street, Edmonton, Alberta, Canada
84th Street (Manhattan), New York City
84th Street (IRT Third Avenue Line), New York City